was a branch of the Japanese company Seiko that produced clocks, watches, shutters, computer printers and other devices. It was the root of the manufacturing companies of the Seiko Group.

History

1881 — Kintarō Hattori opens the watch and jewelry shop "K. Hattori" (Hattori Tokeiten in Japanese; currently named Seiko Holdings Corporation) in the Ginza area of Tokyo, Japan.
1892 —  is established in Tokyo as the clock manufacturing arm of K. Hattori.
1917 — K. Hattori becomes a company (K. Hattori & Co., Ltd.).
1942 — Daiwa Kogyo, Ltd. is founded in Suwa, Nagano by Hisao Yamazaki.
1943 — Daini Seikosha establishes a factory in Suwa for manufacturing watches with Daiwa Kogyo.
1959 — Daiwa Kogyo and the Suwa Plant of Daini Seikosha merge to form 
1961 — Shinshu Seiki Co., Ltd. is established as a subsidiary of Suwa Seikosha.
1970 — Seikosha is split off from K. Hattori & Co., Ltd., and Seikosha Co., Ltd. is incorporated.
1982 — K. Hattori & Co., Ltd. is renamed Hattori Seiko Co., Ltd.
1982 — Shinshu Seiki is renamed Epson Corporation.
1983 — Daini Seikosha is renamed Seiko Instruments & Electronics Ltd.
1985 — Suwa Seikosha and Epson merge to form Seiko Epson Corporation.
1990 — Hattori Seiko Co., Ltd. is renamed Seiko Corporation.
1996 — Seikosha Co., Ltd. is divided into Seiko Precision Inc. and Seiko Clock Inc.
1997 — Seiko Instruments & Electronics is renamed Seiko Instruments Inc.
2007 — Seiko Corporation is renamed Seiko Holdings Corporation.
2009 — Seiko Instruments becomes a wholly owned subsidiary of Seiko Holdings.
2020 — Seiko Precision transfers its business operations to Seiko Time Systems Inc. and Seiko Solutions Inc. and dissolves. 
2020 — Seiko Instruments transfers its watch business (development and manufacturing of the Seiko timepieces) to Seiko Watch Corporation.
2021 — Seiko Clock is merged with Seiko Time Systems to form Seiko Time Creation Inc.
2022 — Seiko Holdings Corporation is renamed Seiko Group Corporation.

References

External links
Seiko Group Corporation 
Seiko Time Creaton Inc. 
Seiko Instruments Inc. 
Seiko Epson Corporation 

Watch brands
Manufacturing companies based in Tokyo
Electronics companies of Japan
Seiko
Epson